John Simpson (1788 – April 21, 1873) was a government official and political figure in Canada West.

He was born in England in 1788 and came to Augusta Township in Upper Canada in 1815. In 1819, he became a private secretary for Lord Dalhousie. He was appointed customs inspector at Coteau-du-Lac in 1822. In 1824, he was elected to the Legislative Assembly of Lower Canada in York County. Simpson organized volunteers from the area to help prevent the fort at Coteau-du-Lac from falling into the hands of the Patriotes during the Lower Canada Rebellion. Simpson recommended amnesty for all political prisoners involved in the rebellion except the leaders, who were exiled. In 1841, he was elected to the Legislative Assembly of the Province of Canada for Vaudreuil. Simpson later served on the Rebellion Losses Commission. He retired to Brockville where his son was customs collector and later died in Kingston in 1873.

References 

1788 births
1873 deaths
Members of the Legislative Assembly of the Province of Canada from Canada East
Members of the Legislative Assembly of Lower Canada